Deh-e Ebrahim (also Romanized as Deh-e Ebrāhīm and Deh Ebrāhīm; also known as Ebrāhīm and Shahsavār) is a former village in Tashan-e Sharqi Rural District, Tashan District, Behbahan County, Khuzestan Province, Iran. The former villages of Deh-e Ebrahim, Chahardahi-ye Sohrab, Chahardahi-ye Asgar, Ablesh, Masiri & Tall Kohneh came together to create the city of Tashan. At the 2006 census, its population was 796, in 178 families.

References 

Populated places in Behbahan County